Ronald Thompson (20 January 1932 – 5 June 2020) was an English   professional footballer who played as a wing half.

Career
Born in Carlisle, Thompson played for Raffles Rovers and Carlisle United. Thompson, nicknamed "Ginger", is Carlisle's record-holder for number of appearances in the Football League by an outfield player, making 406 appearances in all competitions. He spent his early career with the club as a semi-professional, combining his playing career with a job at an engineering company. After leaving Carlisle in 1964 after suffering an achilles injury, he later played for Gretna and Penrith.

Along with former Carlisle United teammate George Walker, he set up Carlisle City in 1975.

Thompson died on 5 June 2020 from bowel cancer.

References

1932 births
2020 deaths
English footballers
Carlisle United F.C. players
English Football League players
Association football wing halves
Footballers from Carlisle, Cumbria
Gretna F.C. players
Penrith F.C. players